Manuel Suárez (born 1 October 1950) is a Cuban fencer. He competed in the team sabre event at the 1972 Summer Olympics.

References

1950 births
Living people
Cuban male fencers
Olympic fencers of Cuba
Fencers at the 1972 Summer Olympics